Courts of Georgia may refer to:

Politics of Georgia (country)#Judicial branch, national judiciary of Georgia
Courts of Georgia (U.S. state), all courts, state and federal, in the U.S. state of Georgia
Government of Georgia (U.S. state)#Judiciary, state judiciary of Georgia